Baron Astley may refer to:
Baron Astley (1295)
Baron Astley of Reading